Kind LLC, stylized as KIND, is a snack food company based in New York City. It was founded in 2004 by Daniel Lubetzky. Since 2020, it has been a subsidiary of Mars.

History 
Daniel Lubetzky founded Kind in 2004. The company reached $1 million dollars of sales in the first year.

In 2008, private equity firm VMG Partners invested in Kind. The investment enabled the company to scale its sampling efforts to get more people to try Kind bars. When VMG got involved, Kind bars were only sold in 20,000 locations and Lubetzky's sampling budget was $800. By 2009, that budget was $800,000 and offering free samples became a large part of the Kind marketing plan. In 2014, Lubetzky bought all of VMG's shares.

Today, Kind Bars are sold at more than 150,000 stores in the US. In 2014, they sold over 458 million bars and granola pouches, almost doubling 2013's sales. The company now has nearly five hundred employees.

In 2017 Mars brand purchased a minority stake in Kind. The deal valuated the company at over $4 billion. In 2017 sales  reached $718.9 million.

Kind acquired North Carolina-based Creative Snacks in October 2019. 

In February 2020, Kind launched an expansion into frozen bars, refrigerated nut-butter bars, and chocolate clusters.

Kind movement 
Through the KIND Movement, Kind aims to create a thriving community of people who choose kindness and make kindness a state of mind. In the spirit of this movement, in 2009, Kind launched Do the Kind Thing, an evolving platform that empowers people to turn KIND acts into support for causes. The Kind Movement includes Kind acts, #kindawesome cards, and Kind Causes. To date, Kind has performed, facilitated and celebrated over 1 million Kind acts and has been recognized by Time magazine as a "New Way to Make a Difference".

Acquisition by Mars 
In November 2020, Mars, Inc. announced that it would increase its minority position (acquired in 2017) to full ownership, in a deal worth $5 billion.

Products 

Kind currently offers eight lines: Kind Fruit & Nut, Kind Plus, Kind Nuts & Spices, Kind Healthy Grains Bars, Kind Healthy Grains Clusters, Strong & Kind, Kind Breakfast, Pressed by Kind, and Kind Frozen.

In 2008, they launched Kind Plus, a line of whole nut and fruit bars with fiber and antioxidants.

In 2010, they launched smaller portioned, 100 calorie-range Kind minis. In 2011, they launched a line of Kind Healthy Grains Clusters granola, made from a blend of five grains. In 2012, Kind brought in Kind Nuts & Spices, made with whole nuts flavored with spices that contain 5g of sugar or less per bar. In 2013, Kind launched a line of Kind Healthy Grains granola bars. In 2014, Kind launched its first savory snack line, Strong & Kind, which has 10 grams of soy-and-whey free protein.  Kind Breakfast was launched in 2016.

In 2016, Kind announced an extension to their nuts and spices and fruit and nut lines, to now include Dark Chocolate Almond & Mint.

In non-English speaking countries, the brand is marketed as BE-KIND.

See also 
 Energy bar
 Clif Bar
 Nature Valley
 Protein bar

References

External links 
 

2004 establishments in New York City
Snack food manufacturers of the United States
Food and drink companies established in 2004
American companies established in 2004
Food production companies based in New York City
Mars, Incorporated
2020 mergers and acquisitions